The 1986 Edgbaston Cup was a women's tennis tournament played on outdoor grass courts that was part of the 1986 Virginia Slims World Championship Series. It was the 5th edition of the event and the last to be named the "Edgbaston Cup" before the tournament's name was changed to "The Dow Chemical Classic". It took place at the Edgbaston Priory Club in Birmingham, United Kingdom, from 9 June until 15 June 1986. First-seeded Pam Shriver won the singles title, her third consecutive at the event.

Entrants

Seeds

Other entrants
The following players received entry from the qualifying draw:
  Jenny Byrne
  Sandy Collins
  Cláudia Monteiro
  Elna Reinach
  Julie Salmon
  Kim Sands
  Dinky Van Rensburg
  Masako Yanagi

Finals

Singles

 Pam Shriver defeated  Manuela Maleeva 6–2, 7–6(7–0)
 It was Shriver's first title of the year and the 12th of her career.

Doubles
 Elise Burgin /  Rosalyn Fairbank defeated  Elizabeth Smylie /  Wendy Turnbull 6–2, 6–4
 It was Burgin's second doubles title of the year and the 4th of her career. It was Fairbank's first doubles title of the year and the 12th of her career.

External links
 1986 Edgbaston Cup draws
 ITF tournament edition details

Edgbaston Cup
Birmingham Classic (tennis)
Edgbaston Cup
Edgbaston Cup